I Dream of Jeanie is a 1952 American historical musical film based on the songs and life of Stephen Foster who wrote the 1854 song "Jeanie with the Light Brown Hair" from which the title is taken. The film was directed by Allan Dwan for Republic Pictures and was shot in Trucolor.

The film is also known as I Dream of Jeanie (with the Light Brown Hair).

Plot summary
In 1849 the song Oh, Susannah is a nationwide hit—but bookkeeper Stephen Foster has given his work to several music houses without charge and without credit. His refined true love Inez McDowell, a classically trained singer, despises popular music, especially Stephen's songs. Foster's world changes when Edwin P. Christy sets him straight on the music business and launches his career as an author of the songs the Christy Minstrels use in their shows.

Cast
Ray Middleton as Edwin P. Christy
Bill Shirley as Stephen Foster
Muriel Lawrence as Inez McDowell
Eileen Christy as Jeanie McDowell
Rex Allen as Mr Tambo / Rex Allen / Narrator
Lynn Bari as Mrs. McDowell
Dick Simmons as Dunning Foster
Scott Elliott as Milford Wilson
Andrew Tombes as R.E. Howard
James Dobson as Spike
Percy Helton as Mr. Horker
Glen Turnbull as Glenn Turnbull / Speciality Dancer
Louise Beavers as Mammy
James Kirkwood as Doctor
Carl "Alfalfa" Switzer as Freddie
Fred Moultrie as Chitlin

Soundtrack
 Ray Middleton - "Oh! Susanna" (Written by Stephen Foster)
 Bill Shirley, Ray Middleton and Eileen Christy - "Jeanie with the Light Brown Hair" (Written by Stephen Foster)
 Muriel Lawrence - "On Wings of Song" (Written by Felix Mendelssohn-Bartholdy)
 Muriel Lawrence - "Lo, Hear the Gentle Lark" (Music by H.R. Bishop, words by William Shakespeare from Venus and Adonis)
 Ray Middleton - "Nelly Bly" (Written by Stephen Foster)
 Ray Middleton - "My Old Kentucky Home, Good Night" (Written by Stephen Foster)
 Ray Middleton and Company - "Ring de Banjo" (Written by Stephen Foster)
 Ray Middleton - "Old Folks at Home (Swanee River)" (Written by Stephen Foster)
 Bill Shirley - "Beautiful Dreamer" (Written by Stephen Foster)
 "Rex Allen" - "Come Where My Love Lies Dreaming" (Written by Stephen Foster)
 Danced by Glen Turnbull - "Gwine to Rune All Night (De Camptown Races)" (Written by Stephen Foster)
 Ray Middleton and Company - "Queen of Mirth" (Written by Stephen Foster)
 Eileen Christy - "Haunting My Dreams at Night" (Written by Stephen Foster)
 Muriel Lawrence and Eileen Christy - "You Must Wear a Dainty Ribbon in Your Hair" (Written by Stephen Foster)
 "Old Black Joe" (Written by Stephen Foster)
 Ray Middleton - "Glendy Burke" (Written by Stephen Foster)
 Bill Shirley and Eileen Christy - "I Can Still See Her in My Dreams" (Written by Stephen Foster)
 "Old Dog Tray" (Written by Stephen Foster)

References

External links

I Dream of Jeanie at Internet Archive

1952 films
American historical comedy-drama films
American musical comedy-drama films
1950s historical comedy-drama films
1950s musical comedy-drama films
Republic Pictures films
Films directed by Allan Dwan
Films about composers
Cultural depictions of Stephen Foster
Films set in the 19th century
1950s historical musical films
American historical musical films
Trucolor films
1952 comedy films
1952 drama films
1950s English-language films
1950s American films